Farewell is a live album by jazz composer, arranger, conductor and pianist Gil Evans which was released posthumously to address for the deceased. This album was recorded by King Records (Japan) in New York in 1986 featuring Evans with his Monday Night Orchestra which included Hamiet Bluiett, Bill Evans, and Johnny Coles and originally released in Japan on the King label.

Reception 
Allmusic awarded the album 3 stars stating "The Gil Evans Monday Night orchestra ripped through the four cuts on this '86 session, often at a torrid pace. Even when they slowed things down, the solos were often done at fever-pitch levels".

Track listing 
All compositions by Gil Evans except where noted.
 "Let the Juice Loose" (Bill Evans) - 12:01   
 "Your Number" - 14:12
 "Waltz" - 19:55   
 "Little Wing" (Jimi Hendrix) - 15:54  
Recorded at Sweet Basil in NYC on December 1, 1986 (track 3) and December 22, 1986 (tracks 1, 2 & 4)

Personnel 
 Gil Evans - piano, electric piano, arranger, conductor
Lew Soloff, Shunzo Ohno, Miles Evans - trumpet
Johnny Coles - flugelhorn (track 1)
Dave Bargeron - trombone  
Dave Taylor - bass trombone
John Clark - French horn, hornette
 Chris Hunter - alto saxophone, soprano saxophone, flute
Bill Evans - tenor saxophone, soprano saxophone, flute
Hamiet Bluiett - baritone saxophone, clarinet, bass clarinet  
Hiram Bullock - guitar
Pete Levin, Gil Goldstein - keyboards 
Mark Egan - electric bass  
Danny Gottlieb - drums

References 

1988 live albums
Gil Evans live albums
Albums arranged by Gil Evans